James Charles Russell is a New Zealand conservation biologist and professor at the University of Auckland.

Russell is most widely known for his research on Norway rats (Rattus norvegicus) in New Zealand. One of the rats he studied swam over 400 metres between two Hauraki Gulf islands, breaking the swimming distance record for rats. The intentions of the rat are believed to have been amorous. The rat, known as Razza, was featured in Nature, and later in a children's book by Witi Ihimaera. Russell gained a PhD from the University of Auckland.

He writes a blog for National Geographic on island conservation.

Awards and honours 
In 2012, Russell was awarded the New Zealand Prime Minister's MacDiarmid Emerging Scientist Prize, worth NZ$200,000, for his work using DNA fingerprinting of rats and statistical modelling to address conservation problems.

In 2014, Russell was awarded a Rutherford Discovery Fellowship, worth NZ$800,000, for research on conservation complexity: scaling vertebrate pest control.

References

External links
Professor James Charles Russell, University of Auckland
Russell's page at University of California, Berkeley
Invasion ecology and genetics of Norway rats on New Zealand islands, Russell's PhD thesis

Year of birth missing (living people)
Living people
Conservation biologists
New Zealand biologists
University of Auckland alumni
Academic staff of the University of Auckland